The Belgian State Railways Type 6 was a class of  steam locomotives for express passenger service, introduced in 1885.

Construction history
The locomotives were built by various manufacturers from 1885–1897.
The machines had an outside frame and inside cylinders and a Walschaert valve gear.

References

Bibliography

2-6-0 locomotives
Steam locomotives of Belgium
Standard gauge locomotives of Belgium
Railway locomotives introduced in 1885